Maryon is a French singer. Maryon may also refer to 
Maryon Wilson Park in Charlton, London, UK
Maryon Park in Charlton, London, UK
Maryon-Wilson baronets in Sussex, UK
Maryon (given name)
Maryon (surname)